Taipei Municipal Chenggong High School (CGHS in Hanyu Pinyin, originally CKSH in Wade-Giles: Taipei Municipal Cheng Kung Senior High School, Traditional Chinese: 臺北市立成功高级中學) is a senior high school in Zhongzheng District, Taipei, Taiwan.

History
Founded in 1922, the school was formerly called the Taihoku (Taipei during Japanese rule) Prefectural Second Middle School and then briefly called Taihoku Second Middle School. It moved from the Bodhidharma temple to the present site in 1925, and was intended for the enrollment of Taiwanese students, as all the "first" middle schools were reserved for the Japanese except for Taichung First Middle School (which was founded by a group of local elites in Taichung).

In 1946, the following year of the Allies victory over Japan in World War II and restoration of Taiwan to the Republic of China, the school was renamed the Taiwan Provincial Taipei Cheng Kung High School in memory of the national hero, Koxinga (Cheng Cheng-kung) for his resistance to foreign invaders. In 1955, the school was ordered to disperse, and set up a branch school in Taoyuan, which was later expanded in "the Joint Taoyuan Branch School of the Five Provincial Taipei High School." It became independent and was renamed the Taiwan Provincial Wu-Ling High School in 1959.

In the autumn of 1967, Taipei City came under control of the Executive Yuan. The school was given the name Taipei Municipal Cheng Kung Senior High School. The present name of the school is Taipei Municipal Chenggong High School.

By order of the government, the school began to have evening sessions in 1953, which stopped enrolling new students in 1981. The evening sessions terminated two years later after the final students in the programme graduated.

Surroundings
Chenggong High School is situated in the city center where government offices and other organisational institutions abound. The campus has an area of 20,000 square meters.

Guidance and counseling
The guidance programs are set up by the guidance committee and carried out by the teachers and the counselors. There is one chief guidance counselor and four guidance teachers. The objectives of the guidance services are to improve the students' psychological health and to adjust them well in the learning and living environment.

Club activities
There are 57 clubs for academics, skills and talents, physical training, recreation, leisure activities, and school teams.

Student organizations
The school features autonomous student organizations, such as the class Union, which pushes forward self-governing activities in the school. The Students' Representatives' Union works to promote interschool exchanges. The Club Union assumes responsibility for performances and competitions outside school.

Teaching equipment

Personnel

Qualification of faculty and staff

Notable alumni 
 Hau Lung-bin -  Mayor of Taipei City (2006 - 2014)
 Ambrose King - sociologist
 Gu Long - Wuxia novel writer

Transportation
The school is accessible within walking distance south of Shandao Temple Station of Taipei Metro.

See also
 Education in Taiwan

References

External links

 Official website
 Chenggong High School Campus Network Cooperative Association web site

High schools in Taiwan
Educational institutions established in 1922
Schools in Taipei
Boys' schools in Taiwan
1922 establishments in Taiwan